NACCC may refer to:
 National Association of Charismatic and Christian Churches, a supervisory association in Ghana
 National Association of Congregational Christian Churches, an association of Congregationalist churches based in the US
 North American Computer Chess Championship, a computer chess championship held from 1970 to 1994